The 2016 USL Playoffs is a  postseason tournament following the 2016 United Soccer League regular season, the second since the league rebranded for the 2015 season. Including USL Pro history, it is the fifth postseason tournament. The tournament began on September 30 and will last until October 23.

Sixteen teams (top 8 per conference) will compete, up from 12 last season, in the single elimination tournament. Teams will be seeded one through eight in each conference. The conference semifinal winners will play against each other in the Conference Championship, which will serve as the overall semifinals for the playoff. The winners of the Eastern and Western Conference Championship will play for the championship. The winner of the playoffs will be crowned league champion with the USL Cup.

USL Conference standings 
The top 8 teams from each conference advance to the USL playoffs.

Eastern Conference

Western Conference

Bracket

Schedule

Conference Quarterfinals

Conference Semifinals

Conference Finals

USL Championship

Championship Game MVP: Brandon Allen (NYRB)

Top goalscorers

References 

playoffs
USL Championship Playoffs